Rohan Marlon Anthony Goulbourne (born April 1, 2002) is a Canadian soccer player who plays as a defender for Toronto FC II in MLS Next Pro.

Early life
He began playing Kinder Soccer in Brampton at age 3 and started playing for Woodbridge Strikers SC when he was six. In 2014, he joined the Toronto FC Academy. On September 18, 2018, he made his debut for the senior academy team, Toronto FC III  in League1 Ontario against Vaughan Azzurri.

Career
In December 2020, he signed his first professional contract with Toronto FC II of USL League One to join the team for the 2021 season. He made his debut for Toronto FC II on May 22, 2021 against North Texas SC.

International career
Goulbourne has represented the Canada U17 team at the 2019 CONCACAF U-17 Championship and the 2019 FIFA U-17 World Cup.

Career statistics

Club

References

2002 births
Living people
Canadian soccer players
Association football defenders
Soccer players from Brampton
Toronto FC players
Toronto FC II players
Woodbridge Strikers players
MLS Next Pro players
USL League One players